Horní Lhota may refer to places in the Czech Republic:

Horní Lhota (Ostrava-City District), a municipality and village in the Moravian-Silesian Region
Horní Lhota (Zlín District), a municipality and village in the Zlín Region